The Summer 2016 Tour was a mini concert solo tour of Europe by English musician Sting.

Background

Tour dates

References

External links
 Official website

2016 concert tours
Sting (musician) concert tours